John Hackenley (4 August 1877 – 16 November 1943)  was an eminent Anglican priest, the seventh Bishop of Nova Scotia.

Educated at the University of King's College he was ordained in 1904.  His first post was a curacy at Digby Neck after which he held incumbencies at of Granville, Indian Harbour, La Have and North Sydney. He was then Bishop Coadjutor of Nova Scotia from 1925 until 1934, Bishop of Nova Scotia to 1939 and Archbishop until his death. He married late in life  and there is a memorial to him in the church at French Village.

References

1877 births
1943 deaths
University of King's College alumni
Anglican bishops of Nova Scotia and Prince Edward Island
20th-century Anglican Church of Canada bishops
Metropolitans of Canada
20th-century Anglican archbishops